The Argentina–United States lemon dispute was a World Trade Organization dispute settlement case (DS448) challenging U.S. import laws. On September 3, 2012, Argentina requested the assistance of the World Trade Organization in hosting consultations to discuss the United States procedures. Argentina claimed that the prohibition of imports of this fruit for the previous 11 years, and other restrictive measures, lacked scientific justification. Argentina asserted that the United States was trying to cancel or impair the benefits that it should enjoy under the World Trade Agreements.

The lemon industry 

According to the Federation of American Scientists, the U.S. is the largest importer of lemons at 475,000 metric tons for 2011 to 2012. Argentina is the producer of 1.0-1.5 MMT per year with 260,000 MT of sufficient quality to be sent to the fresh export market. Argentina argues that since others import the fruit the United States, the largest importer of lemons, should follow the same procedure. "Argentine citrus is exported to destinations with very high health standards such as the Netherlands, Spain and Italy, which do not question the excellent quality of Argentine produce," the Argentine government said. The United States is concerned with two plant diseases, citrus variegated chlorosis and citrus greening that could hurt U.S. lemon production.

A 2014 study showed that Argentine lemons contained excessive imazalil pesticide residues. Imazalil is a systemic fungicide, which is used post-harvest on bananas, citrus and as a pre-planting seed treatment of barley and wheat. The US Environmental Protection Agency (EPA) classifies imazalil as a likely human carcinogen, but it is not generally considered to be a dietary risk. The EPA allows for the presence of imazalil residue within certain tolerances in or on specific food commodities.

In 2011, U.S. imports of Argentine farm products topped $1.64 billion, while U.S. agricultural exports to Argentina totaled $154 million. The United States is running a trade surplus or a positive balance of trade.

Origins of dispute 

The U.S., along with Japan, filed their complaints over the import licensing system earlier in August (2012) and the European Union lodged a nearly identical case in May. Following others complaints, Mexico became the fourth country to challenge the Argentine policies. The four challengers assert the same basic allegation: That Argentina has used import licensing and registration requirements as an informal trade balancing program to favor domestic producers, withholding the licenses from importers unless they agree to certain export quotas. In March, 2012, 14 members of the WTO Council for Trade in Goods, including the U.S., EU and Mexico, said the regulations were creating long delays and resulting in huge costs for many of the companies doing business with Argentina. The countries said the policies were unbefitting a WTO nation, and urged Argentina to dismantle the licensing program.

U.S. Trade Representative spokeswomen, Nkenge Harmon said, "We are concerned with a disturbing trend in which countries engaged in actions that are inconsistent with their WTO obligations retaliate with counter-complaints rather than fix the underlying problem raised in complaint”.
 This particular case seems to be a part of larger problem and an act of retaliation.

The WTO case 

Argentina claims that the prohibition of imports of this fruit for the last 11 years, and other restrictive measures, lack scientific justification. Argentina also claims that the measures of the United States appear to cancel or impair the benefits for Argentina derived, directly or indirectly, from the relevant WTO Agreements.

Argentina challenged the U.S. by these specific measures:
 a series of US measures allegedly maintained for the past 11 years, which Argentina argues constitute an import prohibition on citrus fruits affecting fresh lemons originating in the Northwest region of Argentina;
 the United States' failure to grant approval for the importation of fresh lemons from the Northwest region of Argentina; and
 alleged undue delays in the approval procedures for the importation of fresh lemons from the Northwest region of Argentina.

On December 6, 2012, Argentina requested the establishment of a panel. At its meeting on 17 December 2012, the Dispute Settlement Body deferred the establishment of a panel. There have been no further updates on the case since December 2012.

See also
List of WTO dispute settlement cases

References 

World Trade Organization dispute settlement cases
Argentina–United States relations
2010s in Argentina
Foreign trade of the United States
Foreign trade of Argentina